Faxeladol (INN, USAN) (code names GRTA-9906, GRTA-0009906, EM-906, GCR-9905, GRT-TA300) is an opioid analgesic which was developed by Grünenthal GmbH but was never marketed for medical use anywhere in the world. It is related to tramadol and ciramadol, and was developed shortly after tramadol in the late 1970s. Similarly to tramadol, it was believed faxeladol would have analgesic, as well as antidepressant effects, due to its action on serotonin and norepinephrine reuptake. In various studies in the 1970s alongside tramadol, faxeladol was seen to be slightly more potent than tramadol, but with a higher rate of sudden seizures than tramadol, which is known to cause seizures without warning in some users.

See also
 Bromadol
 Profadol
 Tapentadol
 Thiobromadol

References

Analgesics
Phenols
Synthetic opioids